Kərəmli is a village and municipality in the Goygol District of Azerbaijan. The village had an Armenian population before the exodus of Armenians from Azerbaijan after the outbreak of the Nagorno-Karabakh conflict.

Toponymy 
The village was previously known as Qarakeşiş and 26 Bakı Komissarı adına.

Demographics 
The village has a population of 382.

References 

Populated places in Goygol District